Lemon Creek is a stream in Berrien County, in the U.S. state of Michigan. It is a tributary to the St. Joseph River.

Lemon Creek has the name of William Lemon, a pioneer citizen.

References

Rivers of Berrien County, Michigan
Rivers of Michigan